William Blathwayt (or Blathwayte) (1649 – 16 August 1717) was an English diplomat, public official and Whig politician who sat in the English and British House of Commons between 1685 and 1710. He established the War Office as a department of the British Government and played an important part in administering the English (later British) colonies of North America.

Life
Blaythwayt was baptized in the parish of St Martin-in-the-Fields in London on 2 March 1649, the only son of William Blathwayt, barrister, of the Middle Temple, and his wife  Anne Povey, daughter of Justinian Povey of Hounslow, Middlesex, who was accountant-general to Queen Anne of Denmark. He was born to a well-to-do family of Protestant merchants and lawyers. After his father's death, his mother remarried Thomas Vivian, of the prominent Cornish family. In 1665 he was admitted at Middle Temple.  
 
Blaythwayt joined the diplomatic service in 1668 when his uncle Thomas Povey, an influential London lawyer, found him a post as Clerk of the English embassy at The Hague. He followed this in 1672 with a year as Clerk of Embassy at  Copenhagen and Stockholm. From 1672 to 1673 he travelled in Sweden, Germany, Italy, Switzerland and  France and in the course of his tour, he studied at Padua University. 

Blaythwayt returned to London in the early 1670s, and was assistant secretary of trade and plantations from 1675 to 1679. He became a Clerk of the Privy Council in Extraordinary in 1678 and in 1679 was promoted to secretary of trade and plantations. Also in 1679, he was considered "as a very fit person" to be assistant to the secretary of the council, being heavily involved in the administration of England's colonies in North America. In 1680, he became the first surveyor and auditor-general of royal revenues in America. He became under-secretary of state (north) in 1681 until he obtained by purchase in 1683 the office of Secretary at War which he held to February 1689. His role as Secretary at War was originally merely the role of secretary to the Commander-in-Chief of the British Army but under Blathwayt the remit of the Secretary was greatly expanded to encompass all areas of Army administration. He effectively established the War Office as a department of the government, although he had very little input into the actual conduct of wars. Issues of strategic policy during wartime were managed by the Northern and Southern Departments (the predecessors of today's Foreign Office and Home Office respectively). 

At the 1685 English general election Blathwayt was returned as Member of Parliament for Newtown in the government interest. He was not active in the  Parliament, and was appointed to only one committee to examine the disbandment accounts. 

In October 1686, Blaythwayt became a Clerk of the Privy Council in Ordinary. He became the secretary of the Privy Council's committee on trade and foreign plantations — in effect, colonial under-secretary. It was in this capacity that he became a key figure in American affairs. He was responsible for establishing the charter of the Crown colony of the Province of Massachusetts Bay, the predecessor of the state of Massachusetts. He did much to promote trade in America and benefited considerably from gifts and bribes received in connection with his office (as was the usual practice in his day). His rise was noted by many of his contemporaries; the diarist John Evelyn commended him as "very dexterous in business" and as one who had "raised himself by his industry from very moderate circumstances." On 23 December 1686, he married Mary Wynter, daughter of John Wynter of Dyrham Park. 

Blaythwayt was a witness for the prosecution at the Trial of the Seven Bishops in 1688 and he lost the politically sensitive post as secretary at war after the Glorious Revolution. He was restored to the post in May 1689 and held it to 1704. 

Blaythwayt was returned as a Whig Member of Parliament for Bath in 1693 and held the seat until 1710. He was appointed Lord of Trade in 1696, holding the post until 1707.

Blathwayt retired to Dyrham in 1710 (his wife had died in 1691). He remained there until his death on 16 August 1717 and was buried in the local churchyard.

Art collection
Blaythwayt built a large mansion house for himself at Dyrham Park near Bristol, which he decorated with numerous Dutch Old Masters and sumptuous fabrics and furnishings. His descendants sold a large part of his art collection in 1765, but some of the paintings have been purchased back or remain at Dyrham Park.

References

Attribution

Further reading
"The Lords of Trade and Plantations, 1675–1696", Winfred T. Root (American Historical Review 23 (October 1917): 20–41)
William Blathwayt: a late 17th Century English Administrator, G. A. Jacobsen (New Haven 1932)

External links
William Blathwayt Papers. The James Marshall and Marie-Louise Osborn Collection, Beinecke Rare Book and Manuscript Library.
Chronological Listing of Documents and Events relating to the Massachusetts Mint, Louis Jordan
Committees of the Privy Council for trade and plantations 1675–96
The Golden Falcon Chapter XIII/2 – Neptune

1640s births
1717 deaths
People from Westminster
British MPs 1707–1708
British MPs 1708–1710
British Secretaries of State
Clerks of the Privy Council
Members of the Middle Temple
Members of Parliament for the Isle of Wight
Ambassadors of England to the Netherlands
17th-century English diplomats
English MPs 1685–1687
English MPs 1690–1695
English MPs 1695–1698
English MPs 1698–1700
English MPs 1701
English MPs 1701–1702
English MPs 1702–1705
English MPs 1705–1707